Adrian Winter (born 8 July 1986) is a Swiss professional footballer who plays as an attacking midfielder. Winter has also been capped for Switzerland.

Career
In July 2015, it was announced that Winter was acquired by Major League Soccer team Orlando City SC. Winter made his debut for Orlando City on 8 August as a 72nd-minute substitution for Servando Carrasco. He later scored his first two MLS goals in a 3–1 win over Sporting Kansas City on 13 September. After playing well into the 2016 MLS season, Winter parted ways with Orlando City on 1 July due to family reasons and returned to Switzerland to play for FC Zürich. He made his league debut for Zürich in a 2-0 home victory on 25 July 2016 over FC Winterthur. He played all ninety minutes of the match. He scored his first league goal for the club not long later, on 6 August 2016 in a 4-0 home victory over FC Wohlen. His goal, the third of the match, came in the 40th minute.

References

External links

 
 
 
 FC Zurich Stats

1986 births
Living people
People from Thalwil
Association football midfielders
Swiss men's footballers
FC St. Gallen players
FC Luzern players
FC Wil players
Orlando City SC players
FC Zürich players
Swiss Super League players
Swiss Challenge League players
Major League Soccer players
Switzerland international footballers
Swiss expatriate footballers
Expatriate soccer players in the United States
Swiss expatriate sportspeople in the United States
Sportspeople from the canton of Zürich